Boyd High School is a public high school located in Boyd, Texas, United States.  It is part of the Boyd Independent School District located in southeastern Wise County  and classified as a 3A school by the University Interscholastic League (UIL).  In 2017, the school was rated "Met Standard" by the Texas Education Agency.

Athletics

The Boyd Yellow Jackets compete in the following sports:

Volleyball, Football, Basketball, Softball, Baseball, Track, Tennis & Golf

State Titles

Football 
1983(2A), 2004(2A)

References

External links

Public high schools in Texas
Schools in Wise County, Texas